Union councils of Kushtia District are the smallest rural administrative and local government units in Kushtia District of Bangladesh. The district consists of 5 municipalities, 6 upazilas, 57 ward, 70 mahalla, 71 union porishods, mouza 710 and 978 villages.

Bheramara Upazila
Bheramara Upazila is divided into Bheramara Municipality and six union parishads. The union parishads are subdivided into 43 mauzas and 78 villages. 
Bheramara Municipality is subdivided into 9 wards and 15 mahallas.

 Bahadurpur Union
 Bahir Char Union
 Chandgram Union
 Dharampur Union
 Juniadaha Union
 Mokarimpur Union

Daulatpur Upazila
Daulatpur Upazila is divided into 14 union parishads The union parishads are subdivided into 82 mauzas and 103 villages.

 Adabaria Union
 Aria Union
 Boalia Union
 Chilmari Union
 Daulatpur Union
 Hogolbaria Union
 Khalishakundi Union
 Moricha Union
 Mathurapur Union
 Piarpur Union
 Philipnagar Union
 Pragpur Union
 Ramkrishnapur Union
 Refaitpur Union

Khoksa Upazila
Khoksa Upazila is divided into Khoksa Municipality and nine union parishads. The union parishads are subdivided into 82 mauzas and 103 villages.

 Ambaria Union
 Betbaria Union 
 Gopgram Union
 Janipur Union
 Jayanti Hazra Union
 Khoksa Union
 Osmanpur Union
 Shomospur Union
 Shimulia Union

Kumarkhali Upazila
Kumarkhali Upazila is divided into Kumarkhali Municipality and 11 union parishads. The union parishads are subdivided into 187 mauzas and 201 villages. Kumarkhali Municipality is subdivided into 9 wards and 17 mahallas.
 Bagulat Union
 Chandpur Union
 Chapra Union
 Joduboyra Union
 Jagannathpur Union
 Kaya Union
 Nandalalpur Union
 Panti Union
 Sodki Union
 Charsadipur Union
 Shelaidaha Union

Kushtia Sadar Upazila
Kushtia Sadar Upazila is divided into Kushtia Municipality and 14 union parishads. The union parishads are subdivided into 122 mauzas and 176 villages. Kushtia Municipality is subdivided into 21 wards and 36 mahallas.
 Abdalpur Union
 Ailchara Union
 Alampur Union
 Barkhada Union
 Battail Union
 Goswami Durgapur Union
 Harinarayanpur Union
 Hatsh Haripur Union
 Jhaudia Union
 Mozompur Union
 Monohordia Union
 Patikabari Union
 Ujangram Union
 Ziarakhi Union

Mirpur Upazila
Mirpur Upazila is divided into Mirpur Municipality and 13 union parishads. The union parishads are subdivided into 116 mauzas and 192 villages. Mirpur Municipality is subdivided into 9 wards and 9 mahallas.
 Ambaria Union
 Amla Union
 Bahalbaria Union
 Baruipara Union
 Chhatian Union
 Chithalia Union
 Dhubail Union
 Fulbaria Union
 Kursha Union
 Malihad Union
 Poradaha Union
 Sadarpur Union
 Talbaria Union

References 

Local government in Bangladesh